Tora or Thora are female given names. In North Germanic languages, both Tora and Thora are derived from the Old Norse Þóra.  In English, Tora may also be a short form of Victoria.

Notable people with these names include:

Thora
 Dame Thora Hird (1911–2003), English actress
 Thora Birch (born 1982), American actress
 Thora Borgarhjort or Thora Town-Hart, the daughter of Herrauðr, the earl of Götaland (present-day southern Sweden) in Norse mythology
 Thora Bjorg Helga Icelandic actress
 Thora Magnusdottir (born c. 1100), a daughter of Magnus III of Norway
 Thora Read (also known as Grandma Thora), a character in children's TV and book series Arthur

Tora
 Tora Aasland (born 1942), Norwegian politician and former Minister of Research and Higher Education
 Tora Berger (born 1981), Norwegian biathlete and world and Olympic champion
 Tora Harris (1978), American high jumper
 Tora Vega Holmström (1880–1967), Swedish painter
 Tora Mosterstong, Norwegian concubine of King Harald Fairhair
 Tora Olafsdotter, a comic book superheroine in publications from DC Comics.
 Tora Sudiro (born 1973), Indonesian actor
 Tora Teje (1893–1970), Swedish theatre and silent film actress
 Tora Torbergsdatter (1025-?), Norwegian royal consort

See also

Tola (name)
Tona (name)
Tova

References 

Scandinavian feminine given names